Burcht, occasionally "Burght" in old English texts, refers to a castle or fortress in Dutch and Flemish.

Burcht may also refer to:

Burcht, Antwerp, a village in the Flemish province of Antwerp, Belgium
Antwerpen Burcht, a fortress in Antwerp, Belgium, now known as Het Steen
Burcht van Leiden, an old fort in Leiden, Netherlands

See also
Burg (disambiguation)
List of castles in Belgium
List of castles in the Netherlands